The 2020 Kent State Golden Flashes football team represented Kent State University in the 2020 NCAA Division I FBS football season. They were led by third year head coach Sean Lewis and played their home games at Dix Stadium in Kent, Ohio, as members of the East Division of the Mid-American Conference.

Schedule
Kent State had games scheduled against Alabama, Kentucky, and Penn State, which was canceled due to the COVID-19 pandemic.

References

Kent State
Kent State Golden Flashes football seasons
Kent State Golden Flashes football